The College of Engineering and Computer Science is an academic college of Florida Atlantic University located in Boca Raton, Florida, United States. The college's mission is "    to educate those who will contribute to the advancement of technical knowledge and who will be the leaders of tomorrow, conducts basic and applied research in engineering, computer science, and related interdisciplinary areas, and provide service to the engineering and computer science professions, to the State of Florida, to the nation, and to the community at large."

Departments
The College of Engineering and Computer Science is divided into the following departments:
 Civil Engineering
 Computer Science and Engineering
 Electrical Engineering
 Environmental Engineering
 Geomatics Engineering
 Mechanical Engineering
 Ocean Engineering

Research
Florida Atlantic was the first university in the country to offer an undergraduate degree in ocean engineering in 1964. The first class numbering 35 graduated in 1967. The program was created in response to the loss of the Navy's submarine USS Thresher off the coast of Massachusetts. The sub and its crew were lost after a test dive and found in 8,400 feet of water, far below the sub's crush depth. Concerned about underwater equipment designed by engineers with no marine experience, FAU and the Navy established a program that would eventually draw students from around the globe and be recognized in the 1996 Guinness Book of World Records for "the fastest speed attained by a human-powered propeller submarine."

Other events
During the Spring semester of each year the College of Engineering holds Engineering Week. The week features events centered around a "Brain Bowl" competition between the college's departments. The 2007 theme was Mardi Gras, and featured flamenco dancing.

References

External links
College of Engineering and Computer Science
Florida Atlantic University Official Website

Florida Atlantic University
Computer science departments in the United States